Natassha McDonald (born 27 January 1997) is a Canadian sprinter. She competed in the women's 4 × 400 metres relay at the 2017 World Championships in Athletics. She competed at the 2020 Summer Olympics.

References

External links
 
 

1997 births
Living people
Canadian female sprinters
World Athletics Championships athletes for Canada
Black Canadian track and field athletes
Black Canadian sportswomen
Athletes (track and field) at the 2019 Pan American Games
Pan American Games track and field athletes for Canada
Pan American Games silver medalists for Canada
Pan American Games medalists in athletics (track and field)
Medalists at the 2019 Pan American Games
Alabama Crimson Tide women's track and field athletes
Athletes (track and field) at the 2020 Summer Olympics
Olympic track and field athletes of Canada
Olympic female sprinters
Sportspeople from Mississauga
20th-century Canadian women
21st-century Canadian women
Athletes (track and field) at the 2022 Commonwealth Games
Commonwealth Games gold medallists for Canada
Commonwealth Games medallists in athletics
Medallists at the 2022 Commonwealth Games